The Queen and the Conqueror (Spanish: La reina de Indias y el conquistador), is a Colombian historical drama television series created by Johhny Ortiz, and directed by Camilo Villamizar, and Juan Carlos Vásquez. The series revolves around the history that led to the founding of the city of Cartagena de Indias, of major importance in The Americas. The series is recorded in 4K Ultra-high-definition television. The show is filmed in Colombia, specifically in Sierra Nevada de Santa Marta, the banks of the Magdalena River and Palomino, Villa de Leyva, and Santa Fe de Antioquia. It stars Essined Rivera Aponte, and Emmanuel Esparza as the main's characters.

The series it premiered on streaming on 20 May 2020 on Netflix.

Cast 
 Essined Rivera Aponte as La India Catalina
 Emmanuel Esparza as Pedro de Heredia
 Juliette Arrieta as Sanya
 Manuel Navarro as Diego Nicuesa
 Carlos Kajú as Enriquillo
 Gilma Escobar as Abuela de Toto
 Ilenia Antonini as Luz
 Aroha Hafez as Beatriz
 Alejandro Rodríguez as Pedro Badillo
 Wolframio Sinué as Cacique Galeras
 Cristina Warner as Gloria Badillo
 Maia Landaburu as Constaza Franco
 Fernando Campo as Alberto de Heredía
 Álvaro Benet as José Buendía
 Camilo Jiménez as Falla
 Patricia Castañeda as Criada Carmela
 Jairo Camargo as Arturo
 Adelaida Buscato as Genoveva
 Mercedes Salazar as Inés de López
 Luis Mesa as Fernando de Valenzuela
 Tahimí Alvariño as Isabela I de Castilla
 Kepa Amuchastegui as Bartolomé de las Casas
 Lucho Velasco as Moa
 Alejandro Muñoz as Alonso Montes

References

External links 
 

Spanish-language Netflix original programming
2020 Colombian television series debuts
Caracol Televisión telenovelas
2020 telenovelas
Television series set in the 16th century